In mathematics, strict positivity is a concept in measure theory. Intuitively, a strictly positive measure is one that is "nowhere zero", or that is zero "only on points".

Definition

More concisely,  is strictly positive if and only if for all  such that

Examples

 Counting measure on any set  (with any topology) is strictly positive.
 Dirac measure is usually not strictly positive unless the topology  is particularly "coarse" (contains "few" sets). For example,  on the real line  with its usual Borel topology and -algebra is not strictly positive; however, if  is equipped with the trivial topology  then  is strictly positive. This example illustrates the importance of the topology in determining strict positivity.
 Gaussian measure on Euclidean space  (with its Borel topology and -algebra) is strictly positive.
 The trivial measure is never strictly positive, regardless of the space  or the topology used, except when  is empty.

Properties

The proof is simple: let  be an arbitrary open set; since  is strictly positive,  by absolute continuity,  as well.
 Hence, strict positivity is an invariant with respect to equivalence of measures.

See also

  − a measure is strictly positive if and only if its support is the whole space.

References

Measures (measure theory)